Dark Nature is a 2022 Canadian horror film written and directed by Berkley Brady in her directorial debut. It stars Hannah Emily Anderson, Madison Walsh, Roseanne Supernault and Kyra Harper.

Plot 
A group of women head to a wildlife retreat with their therapist, but find out that they are being stalked by something.

Cast 

 Hannah Emily Anderson as Joy
 Madison Walsh as Carmen
 Roseanne Supernault as Shaina
 Kyra Harper as Dr. Dunley

Production 
Filming took place in the fall of 2021 near the Canyon Creek Ice Cave in Kananaskis. The production set was occasionally visited by a grizzly bear.

Release 
The film premiered at the Fantasia International Film Festival in 2022. It was screened at the Marché du Film.

Reception 
On the review aggregator website Rotten Tomatoes, the film has an approval rating of 86% based on 14 reviews, with an average rating of 6.90/10.

Joe Lipsett of Bloody Disgusting gave the film 3/5 stars, noting its similarities to The Descent and writing: "Unfortunately, Dark Nature skips over its most unique and intriguing elements... in order to get to the only-somewhat satisfying violent bits. The make-up effects are solid, sure, but the film laid the groundwork for a deeper exploration of healing via female friendships and therapy that ultimately fails to pay off." Rachel Reeves of Rue Morgue magazine called the film "a vital feature debut with a strong voice, style and story", adding that director Berkley Brady "mixes up a tasty cinematic cocktail strongly infused with her own creative flavor."

The film was longlisted for the 2022 Jean-Marc Vallée DGC Discovery Award.

References

External links 
 

2022 films
2022 horror films
Canadian horror films
2020s Canadian films
2020s English-language films
English-language Canadian films
2022 directorial debut films